Düdenköy can refer to:

 Düdenköy, Elmalı
 Düdenköy, Yeşilova